Arizona's 21st Legislative District is one of 30 in the state, situated in Maricopa County. As of 2021, there are 42 precincts in the district, with a total registered voter population of 147,604. The district has an overall population of 228,086.

Political representation
The district is represented for the 2021–2022 Legislative Session in the State Senate by Rick Gray (R, Sun City) and in the House of Representatives by Beverly Pingerelli (R, Glendale) and Kevin Payne (R, Sun City).

References

Maricopa County, Arizona
Arizona legislative districts